The Quebec Senior Lacrosse League (QSLL) is a senior B box lacrosse league based in Quebec. The league also includes a team based in Ottawa. QSLL is sanctioned by the Fédération de crosse du Québec.

Winners of the league advance to compete in the Presidents Cup tournament, the national championship of Senior B box lacrosse in Canada.

Presidents' Cup history 
Kahnawake Mohawks have a long history, representing the Iroquois Lacrosse Association (now FNLA) at the Presidents' Cup tournament six times before the formation of the QSLL. The Mohawks were silver medallists in 1968, 1979 and 2016 as well as bronze medallists in 1987, 1996 and 2000. In total, the Mohawks have been Presidents' Cup medallists ten times.

Caughnawaga Indians (present member of Three Nations Senior Lacrosse League), were QSLL champions in 2007 and were medallists in 1969 (silver) as well as winning bronze in 1976 and 2013.

Teams

Former teams 
 Caughnawaga Indians (2007-2010)
 Kahnawake Tomahawks (2014-2015)
 Lasalle Brasseurs (2003-2007)
 Longueuil Bulldogs/Patriotes/St-Hubert Patriotes (2002-2007)
 Montréal Éperviers (2002-2003)
 Montréal Phoenix (2011-2012)
 Sherbrooke Extrême (2007-2008, 2014)
 Shawinigan Éclairs (2002-2006)
 St-Eustache Diablo (2004-2005)
 West End Warlocks (2010)
 Windsor Aigles (2002-2006) - returned to QSLL in 2018
 Valleyfield Warriors/Dinomytes (2005-2010)
 Vermont Voyaguers (2010-2016)

League champions

References

External links 
Official QSLL website

Lacrosse leagues in Canada